The 2023 Nonthaburi Challenger III was a professional tennis tournament played on hard courts. It was the 6th edition of the tournament which was part of the 2023 ATP Challenger Tour. It took place in Nonthaburi, Thailand from 16 to 22 January 2023.

Singles main-draw entrants

Seeds

 1 Rankings are as of 9 January 2023.

Other entrants
The following players received wildcards into the singles main draw:
  Yuttana Charoenphon
  Jirat Navasirisomboon
  Kasidit Samrej

The following players received entry into the singles main draw as alternates:
  Stefano Travaglia
  Beibit Zhukayev

The following players received entry from the qualifying draw:
  Arthur Cazaux
  Evgeny Donskoy
  Jakub Menšík
  Shintaro Mochizuki
  Dominik Palán
  Stuart Parker

The following player received entry as a lucky loser:
  Giovanni Fonio

Champions

Singles

 Sho Shimabukuro def.  Arthur Cazaux 6–2, 7–5.

Doubles

 Nam Ji-sung /  Song Min-kyu def.  Jan Choinski /  Stuart Parker 6–4, 6–4.

References

2023 in Thai sport
2023 ATP Challenger Tour
January 2023 sports events in Thailand